Medieval music is the music of the Western Europe during the Middle Ages, from approximately the 6th to 15th centuries. The first and longest era of Western classical music, Medieval music saw the presence of various music theorists, such as Boethius, Hucbald, Guido of Arezzo, Johannes Cotto, Franco of Cologne and Philippe de Vitry.

Medieval music theorists

 Also a composer
 May have been a composer

References

Notes

Citations

Sources
 
 
 
  
 

 
Theorists